This is a list of the heads of state of Nigeria, from independence in 1960 to the present day. The current constitution of Nigeria has the president of Nigeria as the head of state and government.

From 1960 to 1963, the head of state under the Constitution of 1960 was the queen of Nigeria, Elizabeth II who was also the queen of the United Kingdom and the other Commonwealth realms. The monarch was represented in Nigeria by a governor-general. Nigeria became a republic within the Commonwealth under the Constitution of 1963 and the monarch and governor-general were replaced by a ceremonial president. Nnamdi Azikiwe served as the only indigenous governor-general of Nigeria.

Since Nigeria became a republic in 1963, 13 individuals have served as head of state of Nigeria under different titles. While the incumbent president Muhammadu Buhari is the nation's 15th head of state, he served as the 7th head of state during a military regime between 1983 and 1985. Olusegun Obasanjo served as the 5th and 12th head of state, both served at non-consecutive periods in the office first as military personnels and then later as a civilians. The first ceremonial president, who served during the first republic was Nnamdi Azikiwe, while the first executive president of Nigeria was Shehu Shagari, he was also the first president to be elected to the position.

The interim government of Ernest Shonekan who was deposed 83 days after taking office in 1993 is the shortest in Nigeria's history not including the tenure of Sir James Robertson who served 46 days as governor-general immediately after independence. Aguiyi-Ironsi served 194 days in the office, the shortest for a permanent head of state. Murtala Muhammed served 199 days in the position. Yakubu Gowon served the longest continuous period of almost nine years before being deposed while he was away from the country in 1975. Olusegun Obasanjo served the longest period for eleven years, two hundred and thirty days combined.

Five heads of state were deposed in a military coup (Nnamdi Azikiwe, Yakubu Gowon, Shehu Shagari, Muhammadu Buhari and Ernest Shonekan). Four heads of state died in office, two were assassinated during a military coup (Aguiyi-Ironsi and Murtala Muhammed), while two died of natural causes (Sani Abacha and Umaru Musa Yar'Adua). Three heads of state resigned, Olusegun Obasanjo and Abdulsalami Abubakar resigned after transition to democracy in 1979 and 1999 respectively, while Ibrahim Babangida was forced to resign after he annulled the 12 June 1993 presidential election in which SDP candidate MKO Abiola reportedly won. Olusegun Obasanjo was the first vice president (as Chief of Staff, Supreme Headquarters) to become head of state when Murtala Muhammed was killed during the 1976 Nigerian coup d'état attempt, while Goodluck Jonathan was the first democratic vice president to become head of state when Umaru Musa Yar'Adua died of Illness on 5 May 2010.

Monarchy (1960–1963)

Monarch

The succession to the throne was the same as the succession to the British throne.

Governor-general

The Governor-general was the representative of the monarch in Nigeria and exercised most of the powers of the monarch. The governor-general was appointed for an indefinite term, serving at the pleasure of the monarch. Since Nigeria was granted independence by the Nigeria Independence Act 1960, rather than being first established as a semi-autonomous Dominion and later promoted to independence by the Statute of Westminster 1931, the governor-general was appointed solely on the advice of the Nigerian cabinet without the involvement of the British government, with the sole of exception of James Robertson, the former colonial governor, who served as governor-general temporarily until he was replaced by Nnamdi Azikiwe. In the event of a vacancy the chief justice would have served as officer administering the government.

Republic (1963–present)

First Republic (1963–1966)

Under the 1963 Constitution, the first constitution of the Federal Republic of Nigeria, Nigeria ran the parliamentary system of government with a prime minister and the president replacing the monarch as ceremonial head of state. The prime minister was formed by the leader of the party that won the election. The first federal election was won by the Northern People's Congress led by Abubakar Tafawa Balewa. The president was elected by Parliament for a five-year term. In the event of a vacancy the president of the Senate would have served as acting president.

Military Government (1966–1979)

Major Chukwuma Kaduna Nzeogwu orchestrated the bloody military coup d'état of 1966 which overthrew the First Republic.

Second Republic (1979–1983)

Under the 1979 Constitution, the second constitution of the Federal Republic of Nigeria, the President was both head of state and government. The president was elected for a four-year term. In the event of a vacancy the vice president would have served as acting president.

Military Government (1983–1993)

Major-General Muhammadu Buhari was made military head of state following the coup d'ètat of 1983, which overthrew the Second Republic.

Interim National Government (1993)

Chief Ernest Shonekan was made interim head of state of Nigeria following the crisis of the Third Republic.

Military Government (1993–1999)

General Sani Abacha led the palace coup d'ètat of 1993 which overthrew the Interim National Government.

Fourth Republic (1999–present)

Under the fourth Constitution of the Republic of Nigeria, the president is head of both state and government. The president is elected by for a four-year term. In the event of a vacancy the vice president serves as acting president.

Timeline

Standards

Notes

References

External links

Government of Nigeria
H